Tracy Lee Griffith (born October 19, 1965) is an American actress, sushi chef and painter.

Early life
Griffith was raised in Bedford, New York, the daughter of actor and producer Peter Griffith and his second wife, model and actress Nanita Greene. Her younger brother is Clay Griffith, who became a production designer and set decorator. Her paternal half-sister is actress Melanie Griffith. In the early 1970s, she moved with her family to Saint John, U.S. Virgin Islands. Her parents separated in 1975. Griffith attended a boarding school in Maryland, graduating in 1979, and went on to spend three years at the University of Tennessee where she became interested in acting and dropped out in 1984.

Acting career
Tracy Griffith played supporting roles in some films in which her half-sister Melanie starred, such as Fear City (1985) and Crazy in Alabama (1999). After college, Griffith worked in Hollywood and New York for the next 12 years. Her acting credits include The Guiding Light, The Good Mother (1988); Fast Food (1989); The First Power (1990); The Finest Hour (1991); All Tied Up (1993); 21 Jump Street; and the miniseries Ruby Ridge: An American Tragedy. She was a regular on the ABC drama series The Monroes (1995).

Sushi chef
Griffith was the first female graduate of the California Sushi Academy and one of the world's first certified female sushi chefs. She worked as the featured sushi chef at Tsunami's in Beverly Hills. She also was a partner and chef at Rika's on Sunset, a sushi restaurant on the Sunset Strip in Los Angeles. Griffith developed a style of sushi without raw fish. This led to a publishing deal for her cookbook Sushi American Style, which was published by Clarkson Potter in August 2004 and released a second book in 2013 titled "Stealth Health: Lunches Kids Love", which features recipes that children can make themselves.

Griffith starred as the chef and host on the recurring Cooking with D.I.Y. series and Celebrity Hobbies on the D.I.Y. Network.

Personal life
Griffith married fashion executive Mark Daley on September 17, 2011. 

In 2006, Griffith released a CD titled Red, on the Miura label.

A landscape painter of the Napa Valley area, she had her first gallery show in San Francisco in 2011.  She moved to Florence, Alabama, where she opened her own art gallery in 2019.

Filmography

References

External links
Official Site: 
www.tracyleegriffith.com
https://web.archive.org/web/20080103094417/http://www.tracygriffith.com/

1965 births
Living people
American film actresses
American chefs
Tracy
21st-century American women